The Man of Bronze is a Doc Savage pulp novel by Lester Dent writing under the house name Kenneth Robeson.  It was published in March 1933.  It was the basis of the 1975 movie Doc Savage: The Man of Bronze starring Ron Ely.

Summary
High above the skyscrapers of New York, Doc Savage engages in deadly combat with the red-fingered survivors of an ancient, lost civilization. Then, with his amazing crew, he journeys to the mysterious “lost valley” to search for a fabulous treasure and to destroy the mysterious Red Death.

References

External links
 

1933 American novels
Doc Savage
American adventure novels
Pulp stories
Superhero novels
Works originally published in American magazines
Works originally published in pulp magazines
Novels set in New York City
American novels adapted into films